Outta Sight/Outta Mind is the second album by New Zealand rock band The Datsuns, released on 7 June 2004. It was preceded by the release of the single "Blacken My Thumb". This was followed by one more single, "Girls Best Friend". The album was produced by John Paul Jones, best known as the bass guitarist of the rock band Led Zeppelin.

Track listing
All songs written by The Datsuns.

 "Blacken My Thumb" - 2:46
 "That Sure Ain't Right" – 2:54
 "Girls Best Friend" – 2:49
 "Messin' Around" – 3:39
 "Cherry Lane" – 3:13
 "Get Up! (Don't Fight It)" – 2:28
 "Hong Kong Fury" – 3:49
 "What I've Lost" – 4:02
 "You Can't Find Me" – 3:12
 "Don't Come Knocking" – 3:05
 "Lucille" – 3:15
 "I Got No Words" – 5:20

Charts

References 

The Datsuns albums
2004 albums
V2 Records albums